George F. Moore may refer to:

George F. Moore (lieutenant governor) (1861–1938), Lieutenant Governor of Idaho, 1897–1899
George F. Moore (general) (1887–1949), Major General in the US Army in World War II
George F. Moore (judge), Chief Justice of the Texas Supreme Court in 1867
George Fletcher Moore (1798–1886), Attorney-General of Western Australia
George Foot Moore (1851–1931), American biblical scholar

See also
George Moore (disambiguation)